Women's Rabbinic Network is an American national organization for female Reform rabbis. It was founded in 1980; Rabbi Deborah Prinz was its first overall coordinator, and Rabbi Myra Soifer was the first editor of its newsletter.

In 2010 Ellen Weinberg Dreyfus, a founder and former president of the Women's Rabbinic Network, was selected as 
one of the top 50 rabbis in America by Newsweek and the Sisterhood blog of The Jewish Daily Forward.

In 2012 Rabbi Mary L. Zamore, then the executive director of the Women's Rabbinic Network, wrote to Rabbi David Ellenson, the Hebrew Union College-Jewish Institute of Religion’s then president, requesting that he address the discrepancy of male candidates' ordination certificates identifying them by the Reform movement’s traditional "morenu harav," or "our teacher the rabbi," while female candidates' certificates only used the term "rav u’morah," or "rabbi and teacher." After four years of deliberation, HUC-JIR decided to give women a choice of wording on their ordination certificates beginning in 2016, including the option to have the same wording as men.

The piece "From Periphery to Center: A History of the Women's Rabbinic Network", by Rabbi Carole B. Balin, appears in the book The Sacred Calling: Four Decades of Women in the Rabbinate, published in 2016.

In August 2022, Rabbi Elaine Rose Glickman was named assistant executive director of the organization.

See also 
 Women rabbis
Rabbinic authority

References

External links
 Women's Rabbinic Network Official website

Jews and Judaism in the United States
Jewish feminism
Organizations established in 1980
Rabbinical organizations
 Women's Rabbinic Network